James Gilliam "Mutt" Gee (August 20, 1896 – October 29, 1982) was an American college football player and coach and college administrator. Gee played college football at Clemson University as a center and was selected All-Southern in 1917. He also lettered in baseball at Clemson. Gee and Josh Cody were instrumental in building the Fike Recreation Center. Gee was inducted into the Clemson Athletics Hall of Fame in 1975.

Gee coached football at Sam Houston State University from 1920 to 1922, compiling a record of 6–7–4.  He returned to his alma mater, Clemson in 1927 to serve as the school's athletic director.  He later became the president at East Texas State University—now known as Texas A&M University–Commerce.

Head coaching record

References

External links
 

1896 births
1982 deaths
American football centers
American football guards
Heads of universities and colleges in the United States
Baseball outfielders
Clemson Tigers athletic directors
Clemson Tigers baseball players
Clemson Tigers football players
Florida Gators football coaches
Sam Houston Bearkats football coaches
All-Southern college football players
People from Union County, South Carolina
20th-century American academics